The Mayor of Watford is the head of the borough council of Watford, Hertfordshire, England. The holder of the position is a directly elected mayor using the supplementary vote every four years. The current mayor of Watford is Peter Taylor, who was elected in May 2018 for the Liberal Democrats.

History
Dorothy Thornhill was the first directly elected mayor of Watford; she was elected in May 2002. Thornhill was the first female directly elected mayor in England and the Liberal Democrats' first directly elected mayor. She was re-elected in May 2006, May 2010 and May 2014.

In the 2018 election, Peter Taylor, also member of the Liberal Democrats, was elected as Mayor of Watford.

Referendum

Election results
The position was established after a referendum in 2001 and the first election was held in 2002.

2002

2006

2010

2014

2018

2022

References

Lists of mayors of places in England
Directly elected mayors of places in England
Mayor